The absolute difference of two real numbers  and  is given by , the absolute value of their difference. It is a special case of the Lp distance for all  and is the standard metric used for both the set of rational numbers  and their completion, the set of real numbers .

As with any metric, the metric properties hold:

 , since absolute value is always non-negative.
    if and only if   .
      (symmetry or commutativity).

The absolute difference is used to define other quantities including the relative difference, the L1 norm used in taxicab geometry, and graceful labelings in graph theory.

When it is desirable to avoid the absolute value function – for example because it is expensive to compute, or because its derivative is not continuous – it can sometimes be eliminated by the identity

This follows since  and squaring is monotonic on the nonnegative reals.

See also 
 Absolute deviation

References 

 

Real numbers
Distance